Shap Summit refers to three different route summits in close proximity, of the A6 road, M6 motorway and the highest point of the West Coast Main Line railway in England, near to the Cumbria village of Shap in North West England.

Road
Until 1970 when the nearby M6 motorway was completed, it was one of the major routes between England and Scotland. The route was often hazardous in poor weather, and often became impassable in winter during snowfall.

Rail

The actual summit is in a cutting, a short distance south of the former Shap railway station, there are some sidings at the crest of the summit serving Shap granite quarry. The northbound climb has a  ascent beginning at Tebay, with gradients of up to 1 in 75 (1 foot of rising or falling gradient for every 75 feet of distance).

The line was opened in 1846 as part of the Lancaster and Carlisle Railway, after much debate over the best routing of the line. The line was electrified by British Rail in 1974.

In 2004 the Tebay rail accident occurred, when an unbraked wagon being used by track maintenance workers ran away downhill from Shap Summit, killing four railway workers at nearby Tebay. The inquiry found that driver fatigue was the cause of the incident.

References

Shap
Railway inclines in the United Kingdom
West Coast Main Line